The 2011–12 Meistriliiga season was the 22nd season of the Meistriliiga, the top level of ice hockey in Estonia. Five teams participated in the league, and Tartu Kalev-Välk won the championship.

Regular season

Playoffs

Semifinals 
 Tartu Kalev-Välk – Tallinn Viking Sport 3:1 (1:3, 4:2, 4:1, 5:3)
 Kohtla-Järve Viru Sputnik – HC Panter-Purikad 3:0 (6:2, 5:2, 8:1)

3rd place
 HC Panter-Purikad – Tallinn Viking Sport 0:2 (one game only)

Final 
 Tartu Kalev-Välk – Kohtla-Järve Viru Sputnik 3:1 (3:2, 1:2, 8:2, 5:3)

External links
Season on eurohockey.com

Meistriliiga
Meistriliiga
Meistriliiga (ice hockey) seasons